La Luna (or LaLuna) was a rock-'n'-roll nightclub in Portland, Oregon, United States from 1992 to 1999. It played a central role in Portland's prominence during the emergence of grunge in that era, helping to propel bands from Portland and the surrounding area like Nirvana, Rage Against the Machine, Sweaty Nipples, The Dharma Bums, Pond, Hitting Birth, Hazel, The Spinanes, Elliott Smith, Everclear, Sublime, The Dandy Warhols, Cherry Poppin Daddies and Quasi to national stardom. It was described as the "best medium-size venue in Portland" and "an all-ages venue that somehow manages to stay cool."

Located at the corner of Southeast Ninth Avenue and Southeast Pine Street, La Luna was previously known as the Ninth Street Exit (in the 1970s) and the Pine Street Theater (1980–1991).  It was called RKCNDY Portland (Rock Candy) for most of 1992. It was later known again as the Pine Street Theater (2000–02) and later as Solid State (2004–05).

See also 

 Music of Oregon

References

1992 establishments in Oregon
1999 disestablishments in Oregon
Defunct nightclubs in Portland, Oregon
Defunct music venues in Portland, Oregon
Southeast Portland, Oregon